C. S. Venkataraman (14 September 1918 – 16 March 1994), popularly known as CSV, was a mathematician from Kerala, India. He specialised in the theory of numbers, and his forte was the theory of arithmetic functions.

Known to his friends as CSV, Venkataraman was born at Chelakkara, a small village in Thrissur District, India, on 14 September 1918 as the son of late C V Subbarama Iyer, who too was a professor of mathematics at the University College, Trivandrum, for a long time and later as the principal in 1951.

After his early education in his native village and in Trivandrum, he had his higher education at the Presidency College, Chennai, where he had the opportunity of studying under the eminent K. Ananda Rau, who was a contemporary and a friend of Ramanujan and a student of Hardy at University of Cambridge. Naturally, CSV got the inspiration to become a mathematician from his great professor, Ananda Rau, and also, he got an opportunity to get introduced to another mathematical genius R. Vaidyanathaswamy, who had already established himself at the University of Madras in the 1930s and had set up a tradition and an academic atmosphere that gave Madras international recognition in the field of mathematics. CSV was selected as a research scholar in the Department of Mathematics of Madras University to do research in Theory of Arithmetic function under the guidance of R Vaidyanathaswamy. In fact, there he was in the eminent company of senior research scholars like P Kesava Menon and K G Ramanathan and the theory of multiplicative function formed the material for the dissertations of P Kesava Menon and CSV. The theory of arithmetic functions was initiated in the 1930s by E. T. Bell of the California Institute of Technology and independently by R Vaidyanathaswamy. CSV expounded the theory in a series of remarkable research papers which soon became a classic and CSV was awarded the Ph.D. degree by the University of Madras in 1952 for his "Contributions to the Theory of Multiplicative Functions". During the work leading to the award of Ph.D. degree, he derived a new identity for multiplicative functions of two variables. Vaidyanathaswami's identity for multiplicative functions which appeared in Transactions of the American Mathematical Society in 1931 could be deduced from that of CSV's.

In view of his contributions to the theory of numbers, CSV was nominated for a visiting professorship at the University of North Carolina, Durham, NC, US. This was for possible collaboration with Leonard Carlitz, who learned of CSV's research interest. Though CSV wanted to continue with full-time research, s sudden turn of events in his family circumstances forced him to be near his home town and hence he accepted an offer of a lectureship at Union Christian College, Aluva. After spending a brief time there, he joined the Sree Kerala Varma College, Thrissur, in 1947, where he remained as a professor till retirement. The college he chose to serve had no pretensions of being in the elite league of colleges in Kerala, and it was usually dubbed as a common man's college. Because of his passion for research and teaching, CSV also did not accept the post of the principal of the college, a position which was offered to him at a very young age. Due to CSV's active interest in research, the Department of Mathematics of Sree Kerala Varma College was recognized as a research centre for mathematics by the University of Kerala in 1961. A.C. Vasu and R. Sivaramakrishnan were his doctoral students.

He was a member of Indian Mathematical Society ever since 1945. Mathematicians all over India knew CSV, and it was CSV who for a long time represented Kerala at conferences and meetings. On account of his professional and academic achievements, his name finds, justifiably, a place in the World Directory of Mathematicians published in 1986 under the auspices of the International Mathematical Union. He was a towering personality in the realm of higher mathematics in Kerala for more than three decades. Kerala has produced some world-class number theorists, among whom CSV occupies a pride of place along with his predecessors Sivasankarnarayana Pillai (whom Hardy described as Ramanujan's worthy successor) and P Kesava Menon. Ramanujan Mathematical Society has instituted an annual endowment lecture in his honour.

Tall, erect, well–dressed and with keen, searching eyes, CSV had a magnetic personality with his fair complexion and handsome appearance and was called "Lord Mountbatten" by the colleagues and students in his heyday. CSV died on 16 March 1994.

References

External links
 The Indian Mathematical Society

20th-century Indian mathematicians
Malayali people
1918 births
1994 deaths
People from Thrissur district
Scientists from Kerala